Natalya Sergeevna Voronina (born 21 October 1994) is a Russian speed skater. She is a World Champion and a world record holder in the 5000 m event.

Voronina is the current Russian record holder in the 3000 and 5000 metres.

Career
Voronina finished third in the 3000 meters at the 2015–16 World Cup event in Calgary on 15 November 2015 in a personal and national record of 3:58.78. At the same event she also finished third in the team pursuit. On 20 November, at the second World Cup event in Salt Lake City, Voronina won silver in the 5000 meters, bettering the Russian record to 6:53.16. She won bronze in team sprint at the third World Cup event in Inzell (together with Olga Graf, Elizaveta Kazelina and Margarita Ryzhova). On 11–13 March, at the World Cup Final in Heerenveen, Voronina won gold in the women's 3000 m. Her results rank 2nd in the overall rankings for the 2015–16 World Cup Season in women's 3000 meters behind Czech Martina Sábliková.

Personal records

She is currently in 17th position in the adelskalender with a points total of 158.841.

World Cup results

Podiums

Overall rankings

References

External links

1994 births
Russian female speed skaters
Olympic speed skaters of Russia
Speed skaters at the 2018 Winter Olympics
Speed skaters at the 2022 Winter Olympics
Sportspeople from Nizhny Novgorod
Living people
Medalists at the 2018 Winter Olympics
Olympic medalists in speed skating
Olympic bronze medalists for Olympic Athletes from Russia
World Single Distances Speed Skating Championships medalists
21st-century Russian women